Oakes Ames Memorial Hall is a historic hall designed by noted American architect H. H. Richardson, with landscaping by Frederick Law Olmsted. It is located on Main Street in the village of North Easton in Easton, Massachusetts, immediately adjacent to another Richardson building, Ames Free Library.

History

The hall was built 1879–81 as a gift to the town from children of Congressman Oakes Ames. It was originally intended for use as a Town Hall but in practice has mainly served as a meeting space for private groups.  It was due to dissent amongst different groups in the town at the time that the Oakes Ames Memorial Hall was never used for its intended purpose as the town hall, and to this day the Frothingham House is used for this purpose.

Features
Its first floor is constructed of native, pinkish-gray North Easton granite with Longmeadown brownstone trim. The second floor is brick, with a north-facing dormer half finished in timber and stucco. The steeply peaked roof above is finished in red tile. The front's third-floor, dormer window is wreathed with sculpted foliage, and displays the initials O. A. and twelve signs of the zodiac.

It contains a stage (26 by 18 feet). This arrangement proved impractical due to inadequate stairway access to the hall. The first floor contains a small meeting room and service rooms; the attic contains a Masonic hall.

Gallery

See also
H. H. Richardson Historic District of North Easton
North Easton Historic District

References 
 Oakes Ames: A Memoir with an Account of the Dedication of Oakes Ames Memorial Hall at North Easton, Massachusetts, November 17, 1881, printed at the Riverside Press, 1883, pages 55–57.
 Jeffrey Karl Ochsner, H. H. Richardson: Complete Architectural Works, MIT Press, 1985, pages 33–34. .
 Easton Historic Society (with photos)

External links

Richardsonian Romanesque architecture in Massachusetts
Henry Hobson Richardson buildings
Buildings and structures in Bristol County, Massachusetts
Masonic buildings in Massachusetts
Government buildings completed in 1881
Historic district contributing properties in Massachusetts
Butler–Ames family
National Register of Historic Places in Bristol County, Massachusetts
Clubhouses on the National Register of Historic Places in Massachusetts
1881 establishments in Massachusetts